This page shows the Tajikistan national football team's results in International Matches, as recognized by FIFA:

Overview of results

International Matches

1992–1999

1994

1996

1997

1998

1999

2000-2009

2000

2003

2004

2005

2006

2007

2008

2009

2010–2019

2010

2011

2012

2013

2014

2015

2016

2017

2018

2019

2020–2029

2020

2021

2022

Non-FIFA matches

1992

1993

Result by nations

International Goalscorers
All goalscorers from International Matches.

20 goals

Manuchekhr Dzhalilov

15 goals

Yusuf Rabiev

14 goals

Numonjon Hakimov

10 goals

Tokhirjon Muminov 

9 goals

Fatkhullo Fatkhuloev
Ibrahim Rabimov

8 goals

Nuriddin Davronov
Dzhomikhon Mukhidinov
Davron Ergashev

7 goals

Parvizdzhon Umarbayev 
Dilshod Vasiev 

6 goals

Alier Ashurmamadov
Shuhrat Jabborov
Komron Tursunov

5 goals

Arsen Avakov 
Sukhrob Khamidov
Khurshed Makhmudov
Akhtam Nazarov

4 goals

Alisher Dzhalilov
Jahongir Ergashev
Akhtam Khamrakulov
Rustam Khojayev
Ehson Panjshanbe
Kamil Saidov
Shahrom Samiev

3 goals

Zakir Berdikulov
Pirmurod Burkhanov
Jamshed Ismailov
Vyacheslav Knyazev
Shervoni Mabatshoev

2 goals

Umed Alidodov
Sheriddin Boboev
Rahmatullo Fuzailov
Akmal Kholmatov
Muhammadjon Rakhimov

1 goals

Ilhomjon Barotov
Rahmonali Barotov
Farrukh Choriyev
Konstantin Erofeev
Khakim Fuzailov
Mansur Hakimov
Odil Irgashev
Zoir Juraboev
Denis Knitel
Denis Kulbayev
Oraz Nazarov
Aleksey Negmatov
Shujoat Nematov
Dmitry Saltsman
Umedzhon Sharipov
Valentin Shashkov
Sharafdzhon Solehov
Sokhib Suvonkulov
Farkhod Tokhirov
Daler Tukhtasunov
Davronjon Tukhtasunov
Alisher Tukhtaev
Rustam Usmonov 
Farkhod Vosiyev 
Rustam Zabirov
Islom Zoirov

Own goal

Ruslan Sydykov (Kyrgyzstan)

Awarded Goals

6vs Syria (23/28 July 2011)

Notes

References 

 FIFA.com
 World Football Elo Ratings: Tajikistan

results
Football in Tajikistan
National association football team results